There are 11 Interstate Highways—5 primary and 6 auxiliary—that exist entirely or partially in the U.S. state of South Carolina.


Primary Interstates

Auxiliary Interstates

Business routes

See also

References

External links

Interstate Guide

 
Interstate Highways